Alan Davies: As Yet Untitled  is a British television programme that was first broadcast on Dave and hosted by comedian Alan Davies. In each episode Davies holds an unscripted roundtable discussion with four guests. The guests include stand-up comedians, comedy writers and other well-known figures in the entertainment industry. Each episode begins untitled, hence the series name, but a title is chosen at the conclusion of the episode, often a full or paraphrased quote from one of the guest's anecdotes.

As Yet Untitled began airing with a five-episode series plus a compilation episode in June 2014. The show returned in January 2015 for a ten-part second series with another compilation episode. A third series containing ten episodes began in November 2015, alongside both a compilation episode and Christmas special. The fourth series of ten episodes aired in June 2016. The fifth series, lasting eight episodes, started in February 2017. The sixth series of ten episodes aired from July 2021. After another brief break, a seventh series was recorded late in 2022 at the Battersea Arts Centre, and started airing in March 2023.

Episode list

Series 1 (2014)

Series 2 (2015)
A ten-part second series was filmed and broadcast in 2015 on Dave.

Series 3 (2015–16)
A ten-part third series (plus Christmas special) was broadcast on Dave.

Series 4 (2016)
A ten-part fourth series was filmed during February–March 2016. and was broadcast on consecutive nights from 11 June 2016.

Series 5 (2017)
An eight-part fifth series was broadcast from February to April 2017.

Series 6 (2021)
A ten-part sixth series started broadcasting in July 2021.

Series 7 (2023)
A seventh series is being recorded at the Battersea Arts Centre and is due to air from March 2023.

References

External links 

 
 
 

2014 British television series debuts
2010s British comedy television series
2010s British television talk shows
2020s British comedy television series
2020s British television talk shows
Dave (TV channel) original programming
English-language television shows